WSLY (104.9 FM) is a radio station broadcasting a mainstream rock format. Licensed to York, Alabama, United States, the station is currently owned by Sarah and William Grant, through licensee Grantell Broadcasting, LLC. It features ESPN Radio and The Paul Finebaum Radio Network.

 Previously the station had a mixed urban contemporary format (hip hop, R&B, blues, and gospel), then transitioned over to a full-time gospel format.  The station also broadcast with the JackFM music variety format.

On September 4, 2020 WSLY changed their format from sports to mainstream rock, branded as "Sly 104.9".

References

External links

SLY
Radio stations established in 1976
1976 establishments in Alabama